Chief Mohammed Shitta-Bey (19 December 1824 – 4 July 1895), alias Olowo Pupa, was the first titled Seriki Musulumi of Lagos. He was a prominent Nigerian Muslim businessman, aristocrat and philanthropist who was involved in commerce across Lagos and the Niger-Delta region.  
He was also a patron of the Shitta-Bey Mosque in Lagos, and served as a leader in the Lagos Muslim community until his death.

Early life
Shitta-Bey was born in the liberated African village of Waterloo, Sierra Leone, to Salu and Aishat Shitta, repatriated Yoruba people who were rescued by the British West Africa Squadron from the Atlantic Slave Trade and were a part of the Oku Mohammedan community in Sierra Leone. Shitta-Bey's parents moved from Waterloo to Fourah Bay around 1831, where his father became Imam of the Fourah Bay Muslim community. Shitta's birth name was Mohammed Shitta. The name "Bey" was a title awarded to him by the Sultan of Turkey, Abdul Hamid II, in recognition of Shitta's philanthropy. He was also known as William Shitta. Although Shitta was baptized as a child by CMS missionaries in Freetown, he reverted to his father's Muslim faith when the Shitta family emigrated to Badagry in 1844.

Business career and influence in colonial Lagos
In 1852, a crisis in Badagry between Akitoye and Kosoko forced Shitta's family to move to Lagos. He became an agent to the firms of Pinnock B & Co and Messrs Miller & co. Shitta acquired a tract of land in Egga, a town along the Niger, where he situated a factory. By 1881, he had acquired a steamer for conveying goods from the Niger to the coast. He accumulated significant wealth trading such goods as ivory, kola nuts, egusi, gum copal, hides and clothes, and built a pious reputation. Shitta also expanded his business activities to Sierra Leone.

Shitta's influence also rose as he was friendly with Obas Dosunmu and Oyekan I. He served as an adviser to Oba Oyekan I, and financed Oyekan's candidacy for the Lagos throne until the colonial government approved Oyekan's succession of Dosunmu. As evidence of his political clout, acting colonial Governor Denton identified Shitta as a powerful force resisting the supervision of Muslim schools under the British Board of Education. Subsequently, Shitta acquiesced in his opposition to Western education and joined other members in the Muslim community to promote the idea of a Muslim School teaching modern subjects. Shitta also earned the nickname "Olowo Pupa" (or red money) because of his famous gold cowrie coins.

Religious life
Shitta-Bey was also a philanthropist who donated funds for the growth of Islam in Lagos and Sierra Leone, financing the construction of mosques in both places including the Jamiul Salaam mosque in Foulah town. He was a major donor for the construction of the Lagos Central Mosque in 1873 and held the chieftaincy title of the Seriki Musulumi of Lagos, thus making him the leader of the Muslims of Lagos.

Construction of the Shitta-Bey Mosque and conferment of the "Bey" title by the Ottoman Empire

Mohammed Shitta financed the construction of the landmark Shitta-Bey Mosque in 1891 at costs reported by various authors to be between £3000 and £7000.  The mosque featured Afro-Brazilian themed architecture created by Senor Joao Baptista Da Costa, a Brazilian returnee to Lagos who was assisted by an indigenous builder named Sanusi Aka. Senor Da Costa also designed the Taiwo Olowo Monument in Lagos.

The Shitta-Bey Mosque launched on 4 July 1894, at a ceremony presided over by the Governor of Lagos, Sir Gilbert Carter. Others in attendance included Oba Oyekan I, Edward Wilmot Blyden, Abdullah Quilliam (who represented Sultan Abdul Hamid II of the Ottoman Empire), and prominent Lagosian Christians such as James Pinson Labulo Davies, John Otunba Payne, and Richard Beale Blaize. Quilliam brought a letter accredited to the Sultan of Turkey asking Lagos Muslims to embrace Western education.

It was at the Shitta-Bey Mosque launch that Mohammed Shitta was honoured with the "Bey" title, the Ottoman Order of Medjidie 3rd class (the highest class for a civilian) by Sultan Abdul Hamid II. Thereafter, Mohammed Shitta became known by the compound name Shitta-Bey.

Death
Mohammed Shitta-Bey died of influenza in Lagos on 4 July 1895, exactly one year after the launch of the Shitta-Bey Mosque.

References

Sources

1824 births
1895 deaths
19th-century Nigerian businesspeople
Yoruba businesspeople
Oku people
History of Lagos
Yoruba philanthropists
Sierra Leonean people of Yoruba descent
Sierra Leonean emigrants to Nigeria
Nigerian Muslims
Businesspeople from Lagos
People from colonial Nigeria
Deaths from influenza
Yoruba Muslim leaders
Nigerian commodities traders
Nigerian landowners
Saro people
People from Waterloo, Sierra Leone